Arben Vitia (born 24 December 1973) is a Kosovar Albanian medical doctor and politician, who previously served as minister of health of the Republic of Kosovo.

Biography 
He received his education at the University of Tirana, Albania, and worked as a general practitioner and consultant in Kosovo. In 2010, he join the Vetëvendosje Movement, then a nascent opposition party in Kosovo politics. Having led Vetëvendosje's healthcare committee in the past, he has been the leader of the party branch in the municipality of Prishtina since 2018.

In 2013–2018, Vitia served as director of the healthcare and social welfare department at the Municipality of Pristina.

In the 2019 parliamentary elections, Vitia earned a seat with Vetëvendosje, which became the largest political party in the country. On 3 February 2020, he gave up his seat to be sworn in as minister of health in the first Kurti government.

Vitia returned to government after the 2021 elections, as a candidate for MP, but resigned to serve as minister of health in the second Kurti government. He focused primarily on COVID-19 vaccination during his term.

In August 2021, Vitia was chosen as Vetëvendosje's candidate for mayor of Pristina, but declined to campaign while serving as health minister. He was released from office on 1 October 2021, roughly two weeks prior to the election, which was held on 17 October. He came at the top in the first round with 46.3 percent of the vote, but was defeated by Përparim Rama in the 14 November runoff.

Vitia remains active as a member of the Vetëvendosje presidency and leader of the Pristina branch. He is married to Merita Kasumi Vitia, a pediatrician, and has two sons.

References

1973 births
Living people
Kosovo Albanians
Politicians from Pristina
University of Tirana alumni
Members of the Assembly of the Republic of Kosovo
Government ministers of Kosovo
Vetëvendosje politicians